Carl I may refer to:

 Carl VII of Sweden (ca. 1130–1167), actually the first historically known Swedish Charles.
 Carl I of Norway (1409–1470), VIII of Sweden.

See also
Charles I (disambiguation)